Munk is an unincorporated community located in Gallatin County, Kentucky, United States.

References

Unincorporated communities in Gallatin County, Kentucky
Unincorporated communities in Kentucky